Oh My Sister is the debut studio album by female duo Soulhead and is first album with Sony Music Entertainment Japan. The album reached #3 on the Oricon Weekly charts.

Information
The album was predominantly rap, R&B and hip-hop. It was released on CD and vinyl; the a-side's music videos for the album were later put on their DVD Oh My Sister Live & Clips, which was released in October 2003. The album was their highest charting album (coming in at #3).

Track listing

CD
(Track List)
"Theme of Soulhead"
"Step to the New World"
"Break Up"
"To Da Fake MCs"
"The Air Force" (Interlude)
Lover, Knight, Man
"Playboy"
Secret Love
destiny ~born to be sister~ (Interlude)
Woo!
Too Late
Moon Shine
Sora
sincerely (Interlude)
Oh My Sister
Song for You

12"
(Track List)

Side A
"Theme of Soulhead"
"Step to the New World"
"Break Up"
"To Da Fakes MCs"
"the air force" (Interlude)
"Lover, Knight, Man"
"Playboy"
"Secret Love"
Side B
"destiny ~born to be sister~" (Interlude)
"Woo!"
"Too Late"
"Moon Shine"
"Sora"
"sincerely" (Interlude)
"Oh My Sister"
"Song For You"

References

2003 debut albums
Sony Music albums
Soulhead albums